Lee Jin-young (Hangul: 이진영, Hanja: 李晋暎) (born June 15, 1980 in Gunsan, Jeollabuk-do, South Korea) is a South Korean former right fielder. He batted and threw left-handed. He is now a coach for the South Korea national baseball team.

Career

Amateur career
Attending Gunsan Commerce High School in Gunsan, Jeollabuk-do, Lee was considered the best high school hitter. He was also a highly regarded left-handed power pitcher who threw in the mid-90s as a starter. In 1997, he was selected for the South Korea national junior team that finished in 5th place at the 1997 World Junior Baseball Championship held in Moncton, New Brunswick, Canada.

Professional career

SK Wyverns
Upon graduation from Gunsan High School, Lee was drafted by the Ssangbangwool Raiders, which became the SK Wyverns after the 1999 season, in the first round of the 1999 KBO Draft. Lee made his debut in the pro league against the Hanwha Eagles in Gunsan on May 10, 1999. Appearing in 65 games, he finished his rookie year in 1999 with a .258 batting average, 4 home runs and 13 RBIs.

Next season, Lee became a fixture in right field for the SK Wyverns, appearing in 105 games. However, his batting average dipped to .245, stealing a career-low 2 bases.

In 2001, Lee bounced back from the sophomore slump, batting a respectable .280 with 90 hits, 7 home runs, 16 doubles and 9 stolen bases.

From 2002 through 2004, he notched three consecutive seasons batting .300+, and won his first KBO League Golden Glove Award in 2004.

Along with his batting accuracy, the strong left-armed Lee, the former power pitcher prospect, is also well known for superb defensive skills in right field, which enable him to collect many outfield assists every season. At the inaugural World Baseball Classic in 2006, his defensive skills drew international attention, making acrobatic catches and outfield assists in the tournament.

In the 2007 KBO season, he missed over 40 regular-season games due to injuries, but batted a career-high .350 with 77 hits in 220 at-bats.

In 2008, Lee was placed on the disabled list again and missed 30 games during the season, but batted .300-plus again (.315) with 102 hits in 324 at-bats, compiling 8 home runs, 53 RBIs and a career-high 12 stolen bases.

LG Twins
Lee became a free agent after the 2008 season and signed a one-year deal with the LG Twins on November 20, 2008.

Coaching career
On April 5, 2019, he join Tohoku Rakuten Golden Eagles of Nippon Professional Baseball (NPB) as a trainee coach.

International career
Lee was selected South Korea national baseball team at the 1998 Asian Junior Baseball Championship, 2002 Intercontinental Cup, 2003 Asian Baseball Championship, 2006 2006 Asian Games, 2008 Summer Olympics and 2009 World Baseball Classic.

At the 2009 World Baseball Classic, Lee batted .250 and drove in 7 runs, appearing in all 9 games. In the Team Korea's first game against Chinese Taipei, he smacked a grand slam in the first inning off  the Cleveland Indians’ prospect Lee Chen-Chang to power Olympic champions Korea to a 9-0 win. In Round 2, Lee smacked a 2-RBI single off Yu Darvish in the top of the first inning to lead his team to a 4-1 victory over Japan, which assured South Korea a spot in the semifinals.

References

External links 

 Profile and stats on the KBO official site

1980 births
Living people
Asian Games bronze medalists for South Korea
Asian Games medalists in baseball
Baseball players at the 2006 Asian Games
Baseball players at the 2008 Summer Olympics
KBO League first basemen
KBO League right fielders
KT Wiz players
LG Twins players
Medalists at the 2006 Asian Games
Medalists at the 2008 Summer Olympics
Olympic baseball players of South Korea
Olympic gold medalists for South Korea
Olympic medalists in baseball
People from Gunsan
SSG Landers players
South Korean baseball coaches
South Korean baseball players
South Korean expatriate baseball people in Japan
Ssangbangwool Raiders players
2006 World Baseball Classic players
2009 World Baseball Classic players
2013 World Baseball Classic players
Sportspeople from North Jeolla Province